JATO (jet-assisted take-off) refers to the use of rockets to provide additional thrust for starting aircraft.

Jato or JATO It may also refer to:
Jato (grinder), a form of grain grinder made of stone and used in Himalayan regions
JATO Dynamics, a company that collects data about the automotive industry